In law, a reciprocal obligation, also known as a reciprocal agreement is a duty owed by one individual to another and vice versa. It is a type of agreement that bears upon or binds two parties in an equal manner.

See also
 reciprocal contract
 reciprocal law
 civil conscription

References

External links
 The principle of reciprocal obligations

Contract law
Law of obligations